A/S Tryvandsbanen was a Norwegian company that constructed a rail extension nicknamed Tryvandsbanen ("Tryvann Line") of the Holmenkoll Line from Besserud (then Holmenkollen) to Tryvandshøiden station. The company was established 4 January 1912 and opened the Tryvann Line 15 May 1916. Tryvandsbanen was disestablished on 1 January 1920.

References

1911 establishments in Norway
1920 disestablishments in Norway
Norwegian companies established in 1911
Railway companies established in 1911
Railway companies disestablished in 1920